Graham Shields OBE was the Chief Electoral Officer for Northern Ireland from 11 October 2010 to 31 January 2017, having previously been Assistant Chief Electoral Officer.  He had previously served as a police officer, reaching the senior rank of Chief Superintendent.

Shields was appointed Officer of the Order of the British Empire (OBE) in the 2017 Birthday Honours for services to electoral democracy.

He is a member of Northern Ireland's Human Rights Commission.

See also
Electoral Office for Northern Ireland

References

Elections in Northern Ireland
Living people
Year of birth missing (living people)
Officers of the Order of the British Empire